Gomel or Homiel is the administrative centre of Gomel Region and the second-largest city in Belarus with 526,872 inhabitants (2015 census).

Etymology
There are at least six narratives of the origin of the city's name. The most plausible is that the name is derived from the name of the stream Homeyuk, which flowed into the river Sozh near the foot of the hill where the first settlement was founded. Names of other Belarusian cities are formed along these lines: for example, the name Minsk is derived from the river Menka, Polotsk from the river Palata, and Vitebsk from the river Vitsba.

The first appearance of the name, as "Gomy", dates from 1142. Up to the 16th century, the city was mentioned as Hom', Homye, Homiy, Homey, or Homyi. These forms are tentatively explained as derivatives of an unattested *gomŭ of uncertain meaning. The modern name for the city has been in use only since the 16th or 17th centuries.

History

Under Kievan Rus'

Gomel was founded at the end of the 1st millennium AD on the lands of the Eastern Slavic tribal union of Radimichs. It lay on the banks of the Sozh river and the Homeyuk stream. Sozh's high right bank, cut through by canyons, provided a natural fortification. For some time, Gomel was the capital of the Gomel Principality, before it became part of the Principality of Chernigov. Gomel is first mentioned in the Hypatian Codex under the year of 1142 as being territory of the princes of Chernigov. For some time, Gomel was ruled by the prince of Smolensk Rostislav Mstislavich before it was re-captured by Iziaslav III Davidovich, after whose death it belonged to Sviatoslav Olgovich and then to Sviatoslav's son Oleg. Under Oleg, Gomel went to the Principality of Novhorod-Siverskyi. The next ruler was Igor Svyatoslavich – the hero of "The Tale of Igor's Campaign". During this period, the town was a fortified point and the centre of a volost. In the 12th–13th centuries the city's area was not less than 40 ha, and it had developed various crafts and was connected by trading routes with the cities of Northern and Southern Rus'. Archeological data have shown that the city was badly damaged during the Mongol-Tatar assault in the first half of the 13th century.

In the Grand Duchy of Lithuania and the Polish–Lithuanian Commonwealth

In 1335, the Gomel region was joined to the Great Duchy of Lithuania by Algirdas. From 1335 to 1406 it was under the ownership of prince Patricia Narymuntovich and his sons, from 1406 to 1419 the city was ruled by the Great Duke's deputies, from 1419 to 1435 it belonged to prince Svitrigaila, from 1446 to 1452 to prince Vasiliy Yaroslavich, from 1452 to 1483 to Mozhaysk prince Ivan Andreyevich, and from 1483 to 1505 to his son Semyon, who transferred it to the Grand Duchy of Moscow.

During the Second Muscovite-Lithuanian War of 1500–1503 Lithuania tried to regain Gomel and other lands transferred to Moscow, but suffered defeat and lost one-third of its territory. In 1535, Lithuanian and Polish forces under Jerzy Radziwiłł, Jan Tarnowski and Andrzej Niemirowicz re-captured the city after the surrender of Moscow's deputy, D. Shchepin-Obolensky. In the same year, the Great Duke of Lithuania Sigismund Kęstutaitis founded the Gomel Starostwo. According to the peace agreement of 1537, Gomel together with its volost remained a Lithuanian possession. In 1535–1565 Gomel is the centre of starostwo, and from 1565 onwards Gomel is in the Rechytsa Powiat of the Minsk Voivodeship.

In 1560, the city's first coat of arms was introduced. In 1569, Gomel became part of the Polish–Lithuanian Commonwealth. From this moment on, the city became the arena of numerous attacks and battles between Cossacks, Russia and the Polish-Lithuania Commonwealth. In 1572, Gomel Starostwo was given to B. Sapega. At the beginning of the 1570s, Gomel was captured by the forces of Ivan the Terrible, but in 1576 it was re-captured by J. Radziwiłł. In 1581, Gomel was again attacked by Russian troops, and in 1595–1596 it was in the hands of Severyn Nalyvaiko's Cossacks.

After the beginning of the struggle against Orthodox Christianity in Lithuania, Orthodox Nikolayevskiy Cathedral was closed on the order of Greek Catholic Eparch Josaphat Kuntsevych in 1621. In 1633 the city was besieged by the Cossacks of Bulgakov and Yermolin, in 1648 captured by the Golovatskiy's Cossack detachment, and in 1649 by Martyn Nebaba's detachment. After that, Gomel got through several sieges in 1651 but in 1654 was captured by Ivan Zolotarenko's detachment. He and his sons held the city until 1667 and then began to serve under Alexis of Russia, however, after the Truce of Andrusovo Gomel at last returned to the Polish–Lithuanian Commonwealth, where it first belonged to M. K. Radziwiłł and then – till the annexation by the Russian Empire – to the Czartoryski family. During the Great Northern War Russian forces under Aleksandr Danilovich Menshikov stood in Gomel. In 1670, Gomel got the Magdeburg rights. Towards the middle of the 17th century, the city fell into crisis mainly due to the struggles mentioned above. It suffered significant damage, the population decreased severely, and many crafts disappeared.

In the Russian Empire 

The period when Gomel was part of the Russian Empire was marked by rapid growth of the population, urban infrastructure, and industrial capacity.

Gomel became part of the Russian Empire after the first partition of the Polish–Lithuanian Commonwealth in 1772 and was confiscated by the imperial treasury. In 1775, Empress Catherine II gave Gomel and Gomel eldership in the eternal hereditary possession of Russian military commander Pyotr Rumyantsev.

The Peter and Paul Cathedral, designed by architect John Clark, was built in 1809–1819. Nikolay Rumyantsev opened the first high school, hotel courtyard, glass, tile, distilleries, weaving and spinning factories, and he built a church, a synagogue, a pharmacy, a hospice and a permanent wooden bridge across the Sozh river.

After the death of Nikolay Rumyantsev, the city came in possession of his brother Sergei Petrovich Rumyantsev. However, due to lack of money, Sergei indebted Gomel with the state treasury of the Russian Empire. Subsequently, after not being able to pay off the debt, the treasury sold the city. Gomel Palace was acquired by Prince Ivan Paskevich, and the rest of the city by Nicholas I (1838). Paskevich had an English garden made around the palace, which is still in place today. In 1856, the estate passed on to his son Fyodor Ivanovich Paskevich.

By 1913, Gomel was a major industrial city with 104,500 inhabitants.

Ukrainian period 
Preceding the treaty of Brest-Litovsk, on 1 March 1918 the city was occupied (the Executive Committee of the Gomel Council of Workers' Deputies had left already on 21 February) by German forces. In March 1918 the city became part of Chernihiv Governorate of the Ukrainian State. After the overthrow of the Ukrainian State Gomel was administered by the Ukrainian People's Republic for 25 days.

Soviet period 

On 14 January 1919, Gomel was occupied by the Red Army.

In 1919, Gomel became the centre of the Gomel Governorate in the Russian Soviet Federative Socialist Republic. After the end of the hostilities, restoration of industry and transport began. In the 1920s, a number of large businesses had been created: shipyards, a factory named "Polespechat", a shoe factory named "Trud", a bakery, and the first phase of a municipal power plant. In 1926 the city was passed to the Byelorussian SSR.

By 1940, 264 industrial enterprises had been established

World War II
During World War II, Gomel was under Nazi occupation from 19 August 1941 until 26 November 1943. The city was taken by Rokossovsky's Belorussian Front during the Gomel-Rechitsa Offensive. Eighty percent of the city was destroyed. The population of Gomel had dropped dramatically. According to the data of the registry, the population of Gomel numbered less than 15,000 inhabitants, compared to 144,000 in 1940.

Post-war period 
After the war, restoration of Gomel began promptly. The majority of pre-revolutionary buildings were lost. City streets were considerably expanded, and buildings in Stalinist style were erected. In 1950, almost all of the pre-war enterprises resumed their work.

Chernobyl disaster
As a result of the disaster at the Chernobyl Nuclear Power Plant on 26 April 1986, Gomel suffered radioactive contamination. At the beginning of the 21st century, a scientific centre and practice for radiation medicine and human ecology was built in Gomel to overcome and study the consequences of the catastrophe at Chernobyl.

The development of radiological dose values varies between individual villages in severely contaminated regions, depending on the surroundings and the economic orientation. In general, life is possible in these areas today, even in formerly closed-off zones, if appropriate dietary rules are observed.

Establishment of the Republic of Belarus 
On 27 July 1990, the Declaration of State Sovereignty of the Byelorussian Soviet Socialist Republic was drafted. Gomel became a city in the independent state of the Republic of Belarus the following year.

In the first half of the 1990s, Gomel, like the whole of Belarus, was struck by an acute socio-economic crisis: living standards and the volume of industrial production fell sharply, the death rate exceeded the birth rate, and the crime rate increased. From 1996 onwards the situation in the country and in Gomel began to stabilize and improve gradually.

Population 

 Population  of Gomel, 1775–2015 

In 2013, the city's population numbered 515,325, indicating a positive population growth and hence a reversal of the demographic crisis that began in 1993.

Jewish community 

After the annexation of Gomel by the Russian Empire and the creation of the Pale of Settlement, Gomel gradually became a centre of resettlement for the Jewish population of Russia. According to the 1897 census, 55% of the population of Gomel were Jews. In 1903, there was a violent pogrom against the Jewish population of the city. From that moment on, a gradual decrease of the number of Jews in the city began.  40,880 Jews lived in Gomel in 1939, when they comprised 29.4 percent of the total population. Most Jews had left the city in anticipation of German occupation, but still between 3,000 and 4,000 Gomel Jews fell victim to the Holocaust. The end of the 1980s and beginning of the 1990s saw mass emigration of Jews from Gomel, but at the same time restoration of Jewish institutions in the city by the remaining Jewish inhabitants.

Geography

The terrain on which the city as a whole is built, is flat. On the right bank of the river, it is a gradually decreasing plain water-glacial and fluvial terrace of the Sozh river. The left bank is a low-lying alluvial plain. The highest elevation of 144 meters above sea level is found at the northern outskirts of Gomel, the lowest elevation of 115 m at the water boundary Sozh river. Novobelitskiy district, which is located on the left bank of the river (i.e., towards the south), has elevations averaging of 10–15 meters lower than the northern and central parts of the city.

On the left bank of the Sozh many kilometers of beaches can be found.

Climate
Gomel has a warm-summer humid continental climate (Köppen climate classification Dfb). Warm summers and cold winters are caused by frequent arrival of warm sea air masses from the Atlantic and the dominating western transfer.

Transportation

The public transportation system consists of over 1,000 buses and trolleybuses. Over 210 million passenger rides were registered in 2006. Taxi services ($10 for a one-way intra-city ride) are available 24 hours a day. The city is an important railroad hub in the southeastern part of Belarus, as it is situated midway on the Minsk-Kyiv rail link. The strategic location of Gomel near the border with Russia and Ukraine provides a direct connection to the vast railroad networks of those countries.

A trolleybus network opened on 20 May 1962 and consists of 23 routes (not counting variations). On 15 December 2010, after constructing an overhead wire network in the streets of Egorenko, Sviridov and Chechersk, a new trolley line opened to the terminus "Neighborhood Klinkowski" that resulted in a change of trolleybus routes 9, 16, 17. Rolling stock consist of types ACSM-201, ACSM-321, MAZ-203T, ACSM-213.
There are more than 60 bus routes totaling 670 kilometers, and a number of express routes. Rolling stock consists mainly of buses MAZ-105, MAZ-107, MAZ-103, and to a lesser extent MAZ-203, MAZ-206, and since 2014, the extra-large-capacity, low-MAZ-215. Express routes use Rodemich-A type buses. The 24 minibus lines use Ford Transit, GAZelle, Mercedes-Benz, and Peugeot vans.

Sports 

Gomel is home to a wide range of sports facilities that have been developed and improved in recent years. These facilities, including eight stadiums and the Ice Palace, which has two ice arenas, support common activities such as hockey, track and field, and football. HK Gomel of the Belarusian Extraleague is the local pro hockey team.  The Central Stadium is the home of Gomel's local football club, FC Gomel. Gomel hosts multiple international competitions in these facilities, the annual "Bells of Chernobyl" competition being one of the many. In addition to sports facilities, Gomel has a multitude of Olympic Reserve Schools, which are more commonly referred to as sports schools.

Many of Gomel's sports schools prepare athletes from a young age. Numerous champions have been trained by schools such as these. For example, one school, Gomel's Olympic Reserve Number 4, has trained 97 World and European champions as well as two Olympic athletes. Gomel State College of Olympic Reserve, on the other hand, trains coaches rather than athletes. From this school, 44 graduates have participated in the Olympics, European championships, and World championships. Gomel also participates in the Deaflympics and, between the years 2007–2009, has been awarded: two gold medals, one silver medal, and two bronze medals.

Education
Since 1990, Pavel Sukhoi State Technical University of Gomel and Gomel State Medical University have attracted many international students from countries around the world, including the United States, Germany, China, India, Pakistan, Sri Lanka, Syria, Russia, Ukraine, Egypt, Iran and countries in Latin America. Gomel State Medical University provides classes in both English and Russian. Many prominent scientists work here as senior lecturers.

Culture
Throughout the eight hundred-year history of Gomel, only a few sights have been preserved. A small part of them belong to the 1700s and 1800s, the main part belongs to the 20th - 21st centuries. Most of the architectural monuments of the 20th century date back to the 1950s. Most of them are concentrated in the central part of the city.

The Ferris Wheel and the Ferris Tower, located in a park a few hundred meters from the palace complex, are popular for exploring the city. Since the topography of Gomel is relatively flat, the height of the surrounding buildings means it is easy to view the city from the wheel and tower.

Notable residents
 Paluta Badunova, a prominent member of the Belarusian independence movement of the early 20th century, the only woman at the Rada of the Belarusian Democratic Republic and a victim of Stalin's purges of 1937-38
Yitzchak Eizik Epstein (1770–1857), Hasidic rabbi, author of several works of Chabad philosophy
Yuri Foreman, the first Israeli boxing world champion
Leonid Geishtor, Belarusian Olympic champion and world champion sprint canoer
Elena Ginko, athlete
Boris Nayfeld, former Belarusian/Russian mob boss
Andrei Gromyko, a Soviet Minister of Foreign Affairs (1957–1985) and Chairman of the Presidium of the Supreme Soviet (1985–1988)
Gennady Korotkevich, competitive programming champion
Mikhail Grabovski, retired professional ice hockey player, 10 seasons in the NHL
Aaron Lebedeff, (1873–1960) Yiddish singer
Dick Manning, American songwriter
Andrey Melnichenko, Russian businessman and billionaire
 Yuri Rydkin, poet
Stanislaŭ Šabunieŭski 1868 - 1937), architect
Seryoga, rapper
Larisa Shchiryakova, journalist
Bella Shumiatcher (1911–1990), pianist and music educator
Sergei Sidorsky, Prime Minister of Belarus from 2003 until December 2010
Kanstantsin Sivtsov, professional road cyclist
 Sergei Tikhanovsky, political activist
Lev Vygotsky (1896–1934), psychologist
Iryna Yatchanka, Belarusian Olympic medal winner

Twin towns – sister cities

Gomel is twinned with:

 Aberdeen, United Kingdom
 Anapa, Russia
 Armavir, Russia
 Bryansk, Russia
 Burgas, Bulgaria
 Chernihiv, Ukraine
 Cheryomushki (Moscow), Russia
 Clermont-Ferrand, France
 Dnipro, Ukraine
 Donetsk, Ukraine
 Fort Myers, United States
 Harbin, China
 Huai'an, China
 Kaliningrad, Russia
 Krasnoselsky (Saint Petersburg), Russia
 Kurgan, Russia
 Kursk, Russia
 Kutaisi, Georgia
 Liepāja, Latvia
 Magnitogorsk, Russia
 Novi Sad, Serbia
 Omsk, Russia
 Protvino, Russia
 Rostov-on-Don, Russia
 Samara, Russia
 Solomianskyi (Kyiv), Ukraine
 Ulyanovsk, Russia
 Vasileostrovsky (Saint Petersburg), Russia
 Voronezh, Russia

Former twin towns 
 Radom, Poland

On 28 February 2022, the Polish city of Radom ended its partnership with Gomel as a reaction to the Belarusian involvement in the 2022 Russian invasion of Ukraine.

References
Notes

External links

Photos on Radzima.org
History of Gomel
The Korma-Report (Korma-Studie) of the German Research Centre Juelich (Forschungszentrum Jülich) published new data on internal radiation exposure of the inhabitants of a region close to Gomel more than 20 years after the Chernobyl disaster. The data show a significant decrease of the exposure. Resettlement may even be possible in prohibited areas provided that people comply with appropriate dietary rules.

Map of Gomel
Infobelarus
The murder of the Jews of Gomel during World War II, at Yad Vashem website
 

 
Cities in Belarus
Populated places in Gomel Region
1142 establishments in Europe
Radimichs
Minsk Voivodeship
Gomelsky Uyezd
Historic Jewish communities
Jewish Belarusian history
Holocaust locations in Belarus